Pitipana North, Homagama (also known as Prasannapura North) is an administrative division of the town of Homagama in the Western Province of Sri Lanka. Bearing the grama niladhari code 484, the area had a population of 3,762 in 2012. The area is served by a sub-post office and shares a postcode with Pitipana Central- 10206.

Education

Higher education
Buddhist and Pali University of Sri Lanka

Secondary education
Pitipana Maha Vidyalaya

Primary education
Pitipana Kanishta Vidyalaya

References

Populated places in Western Province, Sri Lanka